The Pine Island Shale is a geologic formation in Louisiana. It preserves fossils dating back to the Cretaceous period.

See also 
 List of fossiliferous stratigraphic units in Louisiana
 Paleontology in Louisiana

References 
 

Cretaceous Louisiana
Aptian Stage